The 2014 Women's Indoor Pan American Cup was the 7th edition of the Indoor Pan American Cup, an indoor hockey competition. The tournament was held in Georgetown, Guyana, from 16–21 October.

The United States won the tournament for the first time, defeating Argentina 2–1 in the final. Uruguay won the bronze medal after defeating Canada 3–2 in the third place match.

Teams
The following seven teams competed for the title:

Results

Preliminary round

Fixtures

Classification round

Fifth to seventh place classification

Crossover

Fifth and Sixth place

Third and fourth place

Final

Awards

Statistics

Final standings

Goalscorers

References

External links
Pan American Hockey Federation

Women's Indoor Pan American Cup
Indoor Pan American Cup
International sports competitions hosted by Guyana
Indoor Pan American Cup
Georgetown, Guyana
Indoor Pan American Cup
Pan American Cup